Das iPhone Konzert 2010 is a limited album by electronica group Kreidler, released in January 2011. The album contains live recordings from a concert at NRW Forum Düsseldorf on May 8, 2010.

Track listing
 Untitled – 0:43
 Untitled – 4:32
 Untitled – 3:14
 Untitled – 7:38
 Untitled – 1:10

Personnel
Thomas Klein – iPhone
Andreas Reihse – iPhone
Detlef Weinrich – iPhone

With liner notes by Andreas Reihse.

Release
Special Edition Cd. Annual bonus for friends and supporters of NRW-Forum Düsseldorf, not on sale.

Cover artwork
Handcrafted, comes in a cloth cover, with a colour photocopy stuck to the frontside, and liner notes stuck to the inside.

References

External links
 Discogs.com

2011 live albums
Kreidler (band) albums